Unterwerfung ("submission") is a 2018 German television drama film directed by Titus Selge and starring Edgar Selge. It is based on the 2015 novel Submission by Michel Houellebecq and a German stage adaptation of the novel.

Cast
 Edgar Selge as François
 Matthias Brandt as Rediger
 Alina Levshin as Myriam
 André Jung as Alain Tanneur
 Florian Stetter as Godefroy Lempereur
 Bettina Stucky as Marie Francois Tanneur
 Michael Wittenborn as Walter Zobel
 Valerie Koch as Alice
 Jean-Yves Berteloot as Steve

Production
The film was produced by Rundfunk Berlin-Brandenburg. The screenplay by Titus Selge is based on Michel Houellebecq's 2015 novel Submission and Karin Beier's stage monologue based on the novel. Edgar Selge who performed the monologue at the Deutsches Schauspielhaus in Hamburg also stars in the film. The film combines conventional film scenes with excerpts from the monologue. The theatre scenes were recorded in July 2017 while principal photography for the rest of the film began on 10 October 2017, with scenes shot in Paris and Berlin.

Release
The film premiered on ARD on 6 June 2018.

Reviews
The Süddeutsche Zeitung called the adaptation "remarkable."

References

External links 

 

2018 films
2018 television films
Films based on French novels
Films based on works by Michel Houellebecq
Films set in 2022
Films set in Paris
Films shot in Berlin
Films shot in Paris
German films based on plays
German television films
Films based on adaptations
Films based on science fiction novels
2010s German-language films
2010s German films
Das Erste original programming